The Extraordinary and Plenipotentiary Ambassador of Peru to the Australia is the official representative of the Republic of Peru to Australia.

The ambassador in Australia is generally accredited to neighbouring countries in Oceania, such as New Zealand (until 2019), the Cook Islands, Fiji, Tonga, Papua New Guinea and Vanuatu.

Both countries established relations on March 1, 1963, and have maintained them since. The ambassador to Australia was also accredited to New Zealand until an embassy was opened in Wellington, which closed in 2010 but reopened in 2019.

List of representatives

See also
List of ambassadors of Peru to New Zealand

References

Australia
Peru